Agostinho Cristóvão Paciência best known as Mabululu, (born 10 September 1989) is Angolan international footballer who plays for Primeiro de Agosto as a striker. He played at the 2014 FIFA World Cup qualification.

In 2018–19, he signed in for Primeiro de Agosto in Angola's premier league, the Girabola.

International career

International goals
Scores and results list Angola's goal tally first.

References

1989 births
Living people
Angolan footballers
Angola international footballers
Association football forwards
Atlético Petróleos de Luanda players
Atlético Sport Aviação players
C.D. Primeiro de Agosto players
C.R.D. Libolo players
Domant FC players
G.D. Interclube players
Kabuscorp S.C.P. players
Santos Futebol Clube de Angola players
Progresso Associação do Sambizanga players
Girabola players
2019 Africa Cup of Nations players
Footballers from Luanda